Dadi Sayi-Bok Mayuma (born 31 December 1981 in Kinshasa) is a footballer from the Democratic Republic of the Congo.  He is currently unattached.

Mayuma was fired from Paris FC in February 2009.

He holds a French passport.

References

External links
 
 

1981 births
Living people
Footballers from Kinshasa
Democratic Republic of the Congo footballers
Democratic Republic of the Congo emigrants to France
Association football forwards
SC Toulon players
AS Beauvais Oise players
US Boulogne players
Paris FC players
Ligue 2 players
Olympique Noisy-le-Sec players